The South Bauchi languages (also called the B.3 West Chadic or Barawa languages) are a branch of West Chadic languages that are spoken in Bauchi State and Plateau State, Nigeria.

An extensive lexical survey of the South Bauchi languages had been carried out by Kiyoshi Shimizu from 1974 to 1975. Another early survey was that of Gowers (1907), which included 42 languages of Bauchi.

Languages
The South Bauchi languages include:

South Bauchi languages
Zaar group: Dass; Geji, Polci (Polchi), Saya, Zari, Zeem
Guruntum group: Guruntum-Mbaaru, Ju, Tala, Zangwal
Boghom group: Jimi, Jum; Boghom, Kir-Balar, Mangas

Roger Blench (2020) counted around 38 South Bauchi languages.

Internal classification

Shimizu (1978)
Shimizu (1978) classifies the South Bauchi languages as follows. Individual languages are highlighted in italics.

South Bauchi
East branch
Boghom subgroup
Bòghòm (Burrum)
Kir cluster
Kiir (Kir); Laàr (Balàr)
Mánsi (Mangas)
Guruntum subgroup
Guruntum cluster
Mbaarù
Gùrùntùm
Tala cluster
Sòòr (Zaŋwal); Zaŋwal of Zungur
Lungu (Tala)
Shò (Jù); Jimi
West branch
Barawa subgroup
North Barawa
Geji cluster
Mɨ̀gang (Booluu), Pelu; Gyaanzi (Gèèjì)
Buu (Zàràndaa)
Polci cluster
Zùl; Barang (Baram), Dììr (Baram Dutse)
Bɨ̀lɨ̀ (Bùlì); Nyámzàx (Laŋas), Lundur; Posɨ (Polci)
South Barawa
Zeem cluster
Zeem; Tule (Tulai); Chaari
Dokshì (Lushi)
Dass cluster
Dɨkshi (Bàraza?); Bàndas (Dur)
Boòdlɨ (Zumbul); Wangdày (Wanɗì); Zòdì (Dwàt)
Saya cluster
Zàksɨ̀ (Zàkshì); Bòòt (Boto); Zaarɨ (Zari); Sigidi
Zaar of Kàl; Zaar of Gàmbar Lèère; Zaar of Lùsa

Blench (2021)
Roger Blench (2021) classifies the South Bauchi languages as follows.

South Bauchi
Jimi
Boghom cluster: Mantsi, Boghom, Kir-Balar
Gurdung cluster: Gurdung, Mbaaru, Ju, Tala, Zangwal
Zaar branch
Das cluster:  Diksyhi, Dur, Zumbul, Dot, Wangdi
Polci cluster: Zul, Mbaram, Diir, Buli, Nyamzax, Polci, Luri (†)
Zeem cluster: Zeem (†), Tuli (†), Caari, Dyarim, Dokshi
Geji cluster: Megang, Pelu, Geji, Buu

Names and locations
Below is a comprehensive list of South Bauchi language names, populations, and locations from Blench (2019).

Phonology
Consonants
Like the other West Chadic languages, South Bauchi languages have a rich consonant inventory. They also generally have the lateral fricatives /ɬ, ɮ/, whereas the West Chadic A languages have not preserved such consonants.

Stops: p t k b d g ʔ
Nasals: m n ɲ ŋ
Implosives: ɓ ɗ
Fricatives: f v s z (ʃ) (ʒ) ɣ (h)
Tap: r
Approximants: l j w
Lateral fricatives: ɬ ɮ

Vowels
Blench (2020) proposes that Proto-South Bauchi had a 6-vowel system consisting of /i, ɨ, u, ɛ, ɔ, a/, with length contrast.

Tones
South Bauchi languages have 2-3 tone levels, with Proto-South Bauchi likely having three tones like the nearby A3 West Chadic languages. Some languages also have contour tones (falling or rising).

Morphology
Like the neighbouring A3 West Chadic languages but unlike Hausa, South Bauchi languages do not usually have plural nouns, although certain words for persons such as ‘woman’, ‘child’, and sometimes ‘man/person’ have suppletive nominal forms. Blench (2021) hypothesises that this may be due to contact with Adamawa languages.

Stop consonants at the ends of morphemes are underlyingly voiceless.

See also
South Bauchi word lists (Wiktionary)
Proto-South Bauchi reconstructions (Wiktionary)

References

Bibliography
Caron, Bernard 2002. Review of Ɓarawa lexicon: a wordlist of eight South Bauchi (West Chadic) languages: Boghom, Buli, Dott, Geji, Sayanci and Zul by Ronald Cosper, Munich: LINCOM EUROPA, 1999. Chadic Newsletter, 23: 46–80.
Cosper, Ronald 1999. Barawa lexicon: a wordlist of eight South Bauchi (West Chadic) languages; Boghom, Buli, Dott, Geji, Jimi, Polci, Sayanci and Zul. (LINCOM Studies in African Linguistics, 39.) München: Lincom.
Kraft, Charles H. 1981. Chadic Wordlists: Volume I (Plateau-Sahel). Marburger Studien zur Afrika- und Asienkunde: Serie A: Afrika, 23. Berlin: Dietrich Reimer.

External links
Map of South Bauchi languages by Roger Blench

West Chadic languages
Languages of Nigeria